Melanella arleyi is a species of sea snail, a marine gastropod mollusk in the family Eulimidae. The species is one of many species known to exist within the genus, Melanella.

Distribution

This species occurs in the following locations:

 Caribbean Sea
 Costa Rica

Description 
The maximum recorded shell length is 3 mm.

Habitat 
Minimum recorded depth is 10 m. Maximum recorded depth is 12 m.

References

External links

arleyi
Gastropods described in 2001